Lasila is a village in Rakvere Parish, Lääne-Viru County, in northeastern Estonia.

Lasila manor
Lasila estate dates from the end of the 17th century. The current building was erected in 1862 in a romantic, neo-Gothic style. The interiors were restored in 1976. Embryologist Karl Ernst von Baer spent his early childhood at the manor house, which belonged to his paternal uncle, and a monument commemorating him stands in front of the building. Today, the manor is used as a school.

See also
 List of palaces and manor houses in Estonia

References

External links
Lasila manor at Estonian Manors Portal

Villages in Lääne-Viru County
Kreis Wierland
Manor houses in Estonia